"I Go Ape" is the second single by Neil Sedaka, immediately following his success with the debut single "The Diary", and was written by Sedaka himself and Howard Greenfield. It was released in 1958, and also appears on Sedaka's 1959 debut solo album Rock with Sedaka. The rock and roll novelty song, which name-checks various primates, was performed in the boogie-woogie style of Jerry Lee Lewis.

"I Go Ape" was a relatively minor success in the US, reaching No. 42 on the US Billboard chart. but was a much bigger success in the UK, reaching No. 9 in the UK Singles Chart.

Although Sedaka has insisted he played piano on the session, the session logbooks document Ernie Hayes as the keyboard player. Other musicians included Everett Barksdale and Kenny Burrell on guitar, Lloyd Trotman on bass, Sticks Evans on drums, and King Curtis on tenor sax. The arrangement was by Chuck Sagle.

References

1959 singles
Neil Sedaka songs
Songs written by Neil Sedaka
Songs with lyrics by Howard Greenfield
1959 songs
RCA Victor singles